In the mathematical field of differential geometry, a metric tensor (or simply metric) is an additional structure on a manifold  (such as a surface) that allows defining distances and angles, just as the inner product on a Euclidean space allows defining distances and angles there.

A metric tensor  is positive-definite if  for every nonzero vector . A manifold equipped with a positive-definite metric tensor is known as a Riemannian manifold. Such a metric tensor can be thought of as specifying infinitesimal distance on the manifold. Conversely, the metric tensor itself is the derivative of the distance function (taken in a suitable manner).

While the notion of a metric tensor was known in some sense to mathematicians such as Gauss from the early 19th century, it was not until the early 20th century that its properties as a tensor were understood by, in particular, Gregorio Ricci-Curbastro and Tullio Levi-Civita, who first codified the notion of a tensor.  The metric tensor is an example of a tensor field.

The components of a metric tensor in a coordinate basis take on the form of a symmetric matrix whose entries transform covariantly under changes to the coordinate system.  Thus a metric tensor is a covariant symmetric tensor.  From the coordinate-independent point of view, a metric tensor field is defined to be a nondegenerate symmetric bilinear form on each tangent space that varies smoothly from point to point.

Introduction
Thus a parametric surface is (in today's terms) a vector-valued function

depending on an ordered pair of real variables , and defined in an open set  in the -plane. One of the chief aims of Gauss's investigations was to deduce those features of the surface which could be described by a function which would remain unchanged if the surface underwent a transformation in space (such as bending the surface without stretching it), or a change in the particular parametric form of the same geometrical surface.

One natural such invariant quantity is the length of a curve drawn along the surface. Another is the angle between a pair of curves drawn along the surface and meeting at a common point. A third such quantity is the area of a piece of the surface. The study of these invariants of a surface led Gauss to introduce the predecessor of the modern notion of the metric tensor.

Arc length
The arc length of that curve is given by the integral

 

where  represents the Euclidean norm. Here the chain rule has been applied, and the subscripts denote partial derivatives:

The integrand is the restriction to the curve of the square root of the (quadratic) differential

where

Using matrix notation, the first fundamental form becomes

Coordinate transformations

where the superscript T denotes the matrix transpose.

A matrix which transforms in this way is one kind of what is called a tensor. The matrix

with the transformation law is known as the metric tensor of the surface.

Invariance of arclength under coordinate transformations
Indeed, by the chain rule,

so that

Length and angle
Another interpretation of the metric tensor, also considered by Gauss, is that it provides a way in which to compute the length of tangent vectors to the surface, as well as the angle between two tangent vectors. In contemporary terms, the metric tensor allows one to compute the dot product(non-euclidean geometry) of tangent vectors in a manner independent of the parametric description of the surface. Any tangent vector at a point of the parametric surface  can be written in the form

If two tangent vectors are given:

then using the bilinearity of the dot product,

That is, put

It is also bilinear, meaning that it is linear in each variable  and  separately. That is,

In particular, the length of a tangent vector  is given by

Area
The surface area is another numerical quantity which should depend only on the surface itself, and not on how it is parameterized.

where  denotes the cross product, and the absolute value denotes the length of a vector in Euclidean space. By Lagrange's identity for the cross product, the integral can be written

where  is the determinant.

Definition
Let  be a smooth manifold of dimension ; for instance a surface (in the case ) or hypersurface in the Cartesian space . At each point  there is a vector space , called the tangent space, consisting of all tangent vectors to the manifold at the point .
  is bilinear. A function of two vector arguments is bilinear if it is linear separately in each argument.
  is symmetric.
  is nondegenerate. A bilinear function is nondegenerate provided that, for every tangent vector , the function  obtained by holding  constant and allowing  to vary is not identically zero. That is, for every  there exists a  such that .

Components of the metric

The components of the metric in any basis of vector fields, or frame,  are given by

The  functions  form the entries of an  symmetric matrix, . If

Under a change of basis of the form

That is,

or, in terms of the entries of this matrix,

For this reason, the system of quantities  is said to transform covariantly with respect to changes in the frame .

Metric in coordinates

The metric  has components relative to this frame given by

Relative to a new system of local coordinates, say

the metric tensor will determine a different matrix of coefficients,

This new system of functions is related to the original  by means of the chain rule

so that

where  denotes the Jacobian matrix of the coordinate change.

Signature of a metric

Associated to any metric tensor is the quadratic form defined in each tangent space by

If the metric is positive-definite at every , then  is called a Riemannian metric.

By Sylvester's law of inertia, a basis of tangent vectors  can be chosen locally so that the quadratic form diagonalizes in the following manner

Equivalently, the metric has signature  if the matrix  of the metric has  positive and  negative eigenvalues.

Certain metric signatures which arise frequently in applications are:
 If  is -dimensional and  has signature , then the metric is called ultrahyperbolic.

Inverse metric
Let  be a basis of vector fields, and as above let  be the matrix of coefficients

One can consider the inverse matrix , which is identified with the inverse metric (or conjugate or dual metric). The inverse metric satisfies a transformation law when the frame  is changed by a matrix  via

The inverse metric transforms contravariantly, or with respect to the inverse of the change of basis matrix . Whereas the metric itself provides a way to measure the length of (or angle between) vector fields, the inverse metric supplies a means of measuring the length of (or angle between) covector fields; that is, fields of linear functionals.

To see this, suppose that  is a covector field.

As  varies,  is assumed to be a smooth function in the sense that

Any covector field  has components in the basis of vector fields . These are determined by

Denote the row vector of these components by

That is, the row vector of components  transforms as a covariant vector.

Indeed, changing basis to  gives

So that the right-hand side of equation is unaffected by changing the basis  to any other basis  whatsoever. Consequently, the equation may be assigned a meaning independently of the choice of basis.

Raising and lowering indices

In a basis of vector fields , any smooth tangent vector field  can be written in the form

for some uniquely determined smooth functions . Upon changing the basis  by a nonsingular matrix , the coefficients  change in such a way that equation remains true. That is,

Consequently, . In other words, the components of a vector transform contravariantly (that is, inversely or in the opposite way) under a change of basis by the nonsingular matrix .

A frame also allows covectors to be expressed in terms of their components. For the basis of vector fields  define the dual basis to be the linear functionals  such that

That is, the Kronecker delta. Let

Under a change of basis  for a nonsingular matrix ,  transforms via

Any linear functional  on tangent vectors can be expanded in terms of the dual basis 

where  denotes the row vector . That is,

whence, because , it follows that . That is, the components  transform covariantly (by the matrix  rather than its inverse).

Now, the metric tensor gives a means to identify vectors and covectors as follows. Holding  fixed, the function

This operation takes a vector  at a point  and produces a covector . In a basis of vector fields , if a vector field  has components , then the components of the covector field  in the dual basis are given by the entries of the row vector

Under a change of basis , the right-hand side of this equation transforms via

so that :  transforms covariantly. The operation of associating to the (contravariant) components of a vector field T the (covariant) components of the covector field , where

is called lowering the index.

To raise the index, one applies the same construction but with the inverse metric instead of the metric. If  are the components of a covector in the dual basis , then the column vector

has components which transform contravariantly:

The operation associating to the (covariant) components of a covector  the (contravariant) components of a vector  given is called raising the index. In components, is

Induced metric

Suppose that  is an immersion onto the submanifold . This is called the induced metric.

(This is called the pushforward of  along .)

It follows from a straightforward calculation that the matrix of the induced metric in the basis of coordinate vector fields  is given by

where  is the Jacobian matrix:

Intrinsic definitions of a metric
The notion of a metric can be defined intrinsically using the language of fiber bundles and vector bundles. In these terms, a metric tensor is a function

The mapping is required to be continuous, and often continuously differentiable, smooth, or real analytic, depending on the case of interest, and whether  can support such a structure.

Metric as a section of a bundle

The original bilinear form  is symmetric if and only if

where

is the braiding map.

Since  is finite-dimensional, there is a natural isomorphism

so that  is regarded also as a section of the bundle  of the cotangent bundle  with itself. Since  is symmetric as a bilinear mapping, it follows that  is a symmetric tensor.

Metric in a vector bundle
More generally, one may speak of a metric in a vector bundle. If  is a vector bundle over a manifold , then a metric is a mapping

Using duality as above, a metric is often identified with a section of the tensor product bundle . (See metric (vector bundle).)

Tangent–cotangent isomorphism

The metric tensor gives a natural isomorphism from the tangent bundle to the cotangent bundle, sometimes called the musical isomorphism. This isomorphism is obtained by setting, for each tangent vector ,

Furthermore,  is a symmetric linear transformation in the sense that

This bilinear form is symmetric if and only if  is symmetric.

The mapping , which associates to every vector field on  a covector field on  gives an abstract formulation of "lowering the index" on a vector field.

The inverse  defines a linear mapping

which is nonsingular and symmetric in the sense that

for all covectors , . Such a nonsingular symmetric mapping gives rise (by the tensor-hom adjunction) to a map

or by the double dual isomorphism to a section of the tensor product

Arclength and the line element

The arclength of the curve is defined by

In connection with this geometrical application, the quadratic differential form

is called the first fundamental form associated to the metric, while  is the line element.

For a pseudo-Riemannian metric, the length formula above is not always defined, because the term under the square root may become negative. We generally only define the length of a curve when the quantity under the square root is always of one sign or the other. In this case, define

Note that, while these formulas use coordinate expressions, they are in fact independent of the coordinates chosen; they depend only on the metric, and the curve along which the formula is integrated.

The energy, variational principles and geodesics
Given a segment of a curve, another frequently defined quantity is the (kinetic) energy of the curve:

This usage comes from physics, specifically, classical mechanics, where the integral  can be seen to directly correspond to the kinetic energy of a point particle moving on the surface of a manifold. Thus, for example, in Jacobi's formulation of Maupertuis' principle, the metric tensor can be seen to correspond to the mass tensor of a moving particle.

In many cases, whenever a calculation calls for the length to be used, a similar calculation using the energy may be done as well. This often leads to simpler formulas by avoiding the need for the square-root. Thus, for example, the geodesic equations may be obtained by applying variational principles to either the length or the energy. In the latter case, the geodesic equations are seen to arise from the principle of least action: they describe the motion of a "free particle" (a particle feeling no forces) that is confined to move on the manifold, but otherwise moves freely, with constant momentum, within the manifold.

Canonical measure and volume form
In analogy with the case of surfaces, a metric tensor on an -dimensional paracompact manifold  gives rise to a natural way to measure the -dimensional volume of subsets of the manifold. The resulting natural positive Borel measure allows one to develop a theory of integrating functions on the manifold by means of the associated Lebesgue integral.

More precisely, if  is a manifold with a (pseudo-)Riemannian metric tensor , then there is a unique positive Borel measure  such that for any coordinate chart ,

Here  is the determinant of the matrix formed by the components of the metric tensor in the coordinate chart. That  is well-defined on functions supported in coordinate neighborhoods is justified by Jacobian change of variables.

If  is also oriented, then it is possible to define a natural volume form from the metric tensor. In a positively oriented coordinate system  the volume form is represented as

The volume form also gives a way to integrate functions on the manifold, and this geometric integral agrees with the integral obtained by the canonical Borel measure.

Examples

Euclidean metric
The most familiar example is that of elementary Euclidean geometry: the two-dimensional Euclidean metric tensor. In the usual  coordinates, we can write

The length of a curve reduces to the formula:

The Euclidean metric in some other common coordinate systems can be written as follows.

Polar coordinates :

So

by trigonometric identities.

In general, in a Cartesian coordinate system  on a Euclidean space, the partial derivatives  are orthonormal with respect to the Euclidean metric. Thus the metric tensor is the Kronecker delta δij in this coordinate system. The metric tensor with respect to arbitrary (possibly curvilinear) coordinates  is given by

The round metric on a sphere
The unit sphere in  comes equipped with a natural metric induced from the ambient Euclidean metric, through the process explained in the induced metric section. In standard spherical coordinates , with  the colatitude, the angle measured from the -axis, and  the angle from the -axis in the -plane, the metric takes the form

This is usually written in the form

Lorentzian metrics from relativity

In flat Minkowski space (special relativity), with coordinates

the metric is, depending on choice of metric signature,

For a curve with—for example—constant time coordinate, the length formula with this metric reduces to the usual length formula. For a timelike curve, the length formula gives the proper time along the curve.

In this case, the spacetime interval is written as

The Schwarzschild metric describes the spacetime around a spherically symmetric body, such as a planet, or a black hole. With coordinates

we can write the metric as

where  (inside the matrix) is the gravitational constant and  represents the total mass-energy content of the central object.

See also
 Basic introduction to the mathematics of curved spacetime
 Clifford algebra
 Finsler manifold
 List of coordinate charts
 Ricci calculus
 Tissot's indicatrix, a technique to visualize the metric tensor

Notes

References
 
 .
  translated by A. M. Hiltebeitel and J. C. Morehead; "Disquisitiones generales circa superficies curvas", Commentationes Societatis Regiae Scientiarum Gottingesis Recentiores Vol. VI (1827), pp. 99–146.
 .
 .
 .
 .
  (to appear).
 
 
 
 
 

Riemannian geometry
Tensors
Concepts in physics
Differential geometry
1